Phố Mới is a ward and capital of Quế Võ town, Bắc Ninh Province, Vietnam.

References

Populated places in Bắc Ninh province
District capitals in Vietnam
Townships in Vietnam